Tatiana Kovylina (born 4 November 1981 in Kazan, Soviet Union) is a Russian model. She has appeared in advertisements for Ann Taylor, Calvin Klein Jeans, Cole Haan, and Givenchy.  In 2002, she was on the cover of Madame Figaro and in 2005, she walked the runway for Victoria's Secret, which she returned to in 2009.  

In 2016, Kovylina co-founded Siloulondon.com, a London-based activewear brand.

She has four children with Yuri Shefler, a Soviet-born British and Israeli billionaire businessman.

References

Russian female models
Living people
1981 births
People from Kazan